Putra Heights is a Klang Valley Rapid Transit station in Putra Heights in the southern Subang Jaya. The station are the southern terminus for the Sri Petaling Line and Kelana Jaya Line. The station is located on the intersection of Persiaran Putra Indah and Persiaran Putra Perdana, next to E6 ELITE. Nearby places include Kampung Kuala Sungai Baru, Laman Putra, Putra Indah and Putra Point Commercial Centre.

The station is part of the Prasarana's rail extension for both Kelana Jaya line and Sri Petaling line which joined both lines at this station, after the Masjid Jamek station. The station is opened in June 2016, along with 25 other stations in the extension plan.

The station is one of the largest in Klang Valley. It has four tracks with 2 side platforms and 1 island platform. Because of different rail system developed on both lines, they do not share the same track and use their own individual track instead. The station is the main infrastructure in Putra Heights.

History 
The extension of both Sri Petaling Line and Kelana Jaya Line were announced on 29 August 2006 by then Malaysian Deputy Prime Minister Mohd Najib Abdul Razak. This is also confirmed by then Prime Minister of Malaysia Tun Abdullah Badawi in his National Budget speech in 2006.

Construction started since 2010. However, during the construction of the depot of Putra Heights station, the concrete formwork and scaffolding with a height of 6 meter collapsed, killing two construction workers. 4 other workers suffers minor injury in the accident.

The construction of the station had also received complaints and objections by both Subang Alam and Putra Heights residents. A study by UKM professor Dr Tajul Anuar Jamaluddin, whose opinion was sought by the residents, found the area to be unsuitable as the ground was largely made up of clay and cracked granite, which would be precarious and make it expensive to lay rail tracks. The line will also pass by an artificial lake and an electric transmission line, posing danger to nearby houses.

The station was opened by Dato Sri' Mohd Najib Abdul Razak himself, who was then the Prime Minister of Malaysia. Transport Minister Liow Tiong Lai, Land Public Transport Commission Chairman Syed Hamid Albar and Chief Secretary to the Government Ali Hamsa were also present at opening.

In 2019, the then Minister of Transportation opened an airport shuttle route from the station to KLIA and Klia2. But later on November 18th, 2020, RapidKL on its Facebook page issued a notice that route number E1 (airport shuttle) has been discontinued effective 1 December 2020. Passengers are advised to take an alternative bus operator, Jetbus.

Incidents and accidents 
A taekwondo athlete was sued for assaulting a disabled senior citizen in the station. The athlete, Nur Dhia Liyana Shaharuddin, who won a silver medal in the 2017 SEA Games, was asked to issue a public apology to a 71-year-old partially blind and deaf man for kicking him in the station.

In November 2019 a woman who was waiting on the platform of the station, almost got hypnotized by an old man. The woman was able to escape with the help of two Malay men. She then shared her experience on Facebook.

Station

Station Design 
The station is designed by NRY Architects, which is also responsible for the Awan Besar and Bandar Puteri Puchong LRT station.

The station is inspired by the traditional fish trap called Bubu. Instead of trapping, the station has been designed as a celebration of movement to showcase its function as an interchange station.

The station skeletal structure is covered with photovoltaic cladding to generate solar energy. Glass louvers are added for a naturally-lit interior and shade during rainy seasons. Voids are realised on certain locations of both facades to allow sufficient cross ventilation and constant airflow within the station. As some heat trapped inside the building, a customised jacked roof concept is implemented across the central spine of the envelope to channel it out.

Station Layout 
The station has an island platform (1A and 1B) and two side platforms (2 and 3). Most of the time trains will stop at platforms 1A and 1B, unless the train will be terminated after this station. The station is also equipped with an ample car park, bus terminal on the station ground level and main drop-off and pick-up areas at concourse level.

Bus services

Feeder buses

Express bus

Other buses

Gallery

See also
 Kwasa Damansara MRT station, similar cross-platform interchange concept

References

External links 

 Putra Heights LRT Station

Ampang Line
Kelana Jaya Line